Capitol Center is an office skyscraper in Columbia, South Carolina. At , it is the tallest building in South Carolina. The tower has about 1,000 people inside working every week and about 400 offices. A 26-story skyscraper, it was the tallest structure in South Carolina from its completion in December 1987 to the completion of the Prysmian Copper Wire Tower in Abbeville in 2009. The tower was built on the site of the former Wade Hampton Hotel which was imploded in July 1985. This modern building exterior is finished in double-paned tinted glass with horizontal bands of anodized aluminum color panels. The 25-story tower was completed in 1987 during a Columbia high-rise building boom, as the AT&T Building. Naming rights have been previously held by Affinity and South Trust Bank. The current signage on the building is held by Truist Bank. During its construction in 1986, gubernatorial candidate Carroll Campbell successfully used the then unfinished structure, whose construction was partially financed by the State of South Carolina, as a symbol for excessive government spending.  

Capitol Center contains  of office space, at over 90% occupancy, the building leases to some state government agencies, several top law firms in the state, and other businesses. Attached to the tower is a 7-story parking garage containing over 1,000 spaces. The 25th floor is home to The Capital City Club.

See also
List of tallest buildings by U.S. state

References

External links
Capitol Center Website
Emporis page on tallest buildings in Columbia, South Carolina

Buildings and structures in Columbia, South Carolina
Skyscrapers in South Carolina
Skyscraper office buildings in South Carolina
Office buildings completed in 1987
1987 establishments in South Carolina